Kirkland, Tennessee may refer to:
Kirkland, Lincoln County, Tennessee, an unincorporated community in Lincoln County
Kirkland, Williamson County, Tennessee, an unincorporated community in Williamson County